The Commonwealth Tournament was a men's team golf tournament between teams of amateurs golfers from Great Britain, Australia, Canada, New Zealand and South Africa. It was played roughly every four years, in 1954, 1959, 1963, 1967, 1971 and 1975. In 1971 and 1975 there were only four teams, South Africa did not compete in 1971 while Australia missed the 1975 event.

Format
Each team played the others. Each match was contested over one day with foursomes in the morning and singles matches in the afternoon. There were 3 foursomes and 6 singles in each match.

Results

1954
The first tournament was organised to celebrate the bicentenary of the Royal and Ancient Golf Club of St Andrews. It was played on the Old Course at St Andrews from 1 to 5 June.

The teams were:

Great Britain: David Blair, Ian Caldwell, Frank Deighton, Gerald Micklem, Alan Thirlwell, James Wilson
Australia: Doug Bachli, Harry Berwick, Jack Coogan, Peter Heard, Bill Shephard, Bob Stevens
Canada: Don Doe, Phil Farley, Bob Fleming, Walter McElroy, Douglas Silverberg, Nick Weslock
New Zealand: Tony Gibbs, Tom Jeffery, Stuart Jones, Bryan Silk, Ron Timms, Tim Woon
South Africa: Jimmy Boyd, Roger Brews, Eric Dalton, Denis Hutchinson, A D Jackson, Reg Taylor

Final table

Source:

1959
The second tournament was held at the Royal Johannesburg Golf Club from 3 to 7 November.

The teams were:

Great Britain: Michael Bonallack, Frank Deighton, Reid Jack, Sandy Saddler, Doug Sewell, Guy Wolstenholme
Australia: Doug Bachli, Vic Bulgin, Jack Coogan, Bruce Devlin, Kevin Hartley, Justin Seward, Peter Toogood
Canada: Gary Cowan, John Johnston, Douglas Silverberg, Bert Ticehurst, Nick Weslock, Ron Willey
New Zealand: Bob Charles, John Durry, Bob Glading, Stuart Jones, Ross Murray, Ross Newdick
South Africa: Jimmy Boyd, Denis Hutchinson, Jannie le Roux, Reg Taylor, Arthur Walker, R C Williams

Final table

Source:

1963
The third tournament was held at the Royal Sydney Golf Club from 15 to 19 October.

The teams were:

Great Britain: Michael Bonallack, Peter Green, Michael Lunt, Sandy Saddler, Ronnie Shade, Alan Thirlwell
Australia: Dennis Bell, Phil Billings, Tom Crow, Kevin Donohoe, Kevin Hartley, John Hood
Canada: Keith Alexander, Gary Cowan, Douglas Silverberg, Bert Ticehurst, Bill Wakeham, Nick Weslock
New Zealand: Brian Boys, Peter Creighton, Terry Leech, Stuart Jones, Ross Murray, Ross Newdick
South Africa: B Franklin, John Hayes, Derek Kemp, Jannie le Roux, Dave Symons, Reg Taylor

Final table

Source:

1967
The fourth tournament was held at the Victoria Golf Club, British Columbia, Canada from 9 to 13 August.

The teams were:

Great Britain: Michael Bonallack, Gordon Cosh, Rodney Foster, Dudley Millensted, Sandy Saddler, Ronnie Shade
Australia: Dennis Bell, Phil Billings, Bill Britten, Vic Bulgin, Kevin Donohoe, Kevin Hartley
Canada: Keith Alexander, Gary Cowan, John Johnston, Douglas Silverberg, Wayne Vollmer, Nick Weslock
New Zealand: Geoff Clarke, John Durry, Stuart Jones, Ross Murray, Bruce Stevens, Boris Vezich
South Africa: Hugh Baiocchi, Comrie du Toit, John Fourie, Derek Kemp, Rod Mullan, Dave Symons

Final table

Source:

1971
The fifth tournament was held at the Auckland Golf Club from 20 to 24 October. There were only four teams, South Africa withdrawing because of threats of anti-apartheid demonstrations. With only three rounds of matches, the tournament was originally planned to be played on 20, 21 and 23 October. Rain on the first day meant that the first round of matches was not completed until 21 August, the second round being moved to the following day. Further bad weather caused the final round of matches to be delayed by a day. The event was called the New Zealand Golf Centennial Tournament, celebrating the centenary of golf in New Zealand.

The teams were:

Great Britain: Michael Bonallack, Charlie Green, Rodney Foster, Michael King, George Macgregor, Hugh Stuart
Australia: Peter Bennett, Bill Britten, Kevin Donohoe, Terry Gale, Tony Gresham, Noel Ratcliffe
Canada: Keith Alexander, Gary Cowan, Stu Hamilton, Doug Roxburgh, Douglas Silverberg, Nick Weslock
New Zealand: Rodney Barltrop, Geoff Clarke, Stuart Jones, Ian MacDonald, Paul Shadlock, Ross Murray

Final table

Source:

1975
The sixth tournament was held at the Royal Durban Golf Club from 20 to 22 November. There were only four teams, Australia did not compete.

The teams were:

Great Britain: Nick Faldo, David Greig, Ian Hutcheon, Sandy Lyle, George Macgregor, Geoff Marks
Canada: Cec Ferguson, Robbie Jackson, Jim Nelford, Doug Roxburgh, Kem Tamke, Dave Webber
New Zealand: Rodney Barltrop, Geoff Clarke, Stuart Jones, Ted McDougall, Mike Nicholson, Stuart Reese
South Africa: Coen Dreyer, Chris Heyneman, Gavan Levenson, Robbie Stewart, David Suddards, Peter Todt

Final table

Source:

References

Team golf tournaments
Amateur golf tournaments
Recurring sporting events established in 1954
Recurring sporting events disestablished in 1975